Mialet is the name or part of the name of several communes in France:

 Mialet, in the Dordogne department
 Mialet, in the Gard department
 Mialet, former commune of the Lot department, now part of Saint-Bressou